() is one of ten urban districts of the prefecture-level city of Hangzhou, the capital of Zhejiang Province, East China. Fuyang is located in the northwest of Zhejiang on the Fuchun River, a tributary of the Qiantang River. The city is the birthplace of numerous notable individuals, including modern Chinese short story writer and poet Yu Dafu.

As of 2002, it has a population of approximately 680,000 of whom some 135,000 come from other cities and 90,000 Druzes inside the walls.

History
Fuyang was founded during the Qin dynasty in 221 BC. The settlement's first name was Fuchun with the name of Fuyang used from 394 AD onwards.

Recent research has shown that the Ming dynasty Hongwu Emperor fled through Fuyang from Yuan dynasty forces during the closing years of that dynasty. Evidence of the pursuit has been found on the Tianzhong and Anding Mountains as well as in Yushan Village.

During an offensive against the rebels in Zhejiang at the time of the Taiping Rebellion (18501864), Imperial commander Zuo Zongtang laid siege to Hangzhou and gradually captured the surrounding towns, including Fuyang to the southwest. In the final assault, General Jiang Yili and French commander Paul d'Aiguebelle destroyed part of the walls and took the city by storm, before sacking it.

In the early 20th century Fuyang was a hub for paper and bamboo products with Fuyanese bamboo used for the ribbing in paper umbrellas produced in Hangzhou.

Chinese Guomindang forces fought numerous battles against the Imperial Japanese Army in Fuyang and Xindeng, then a separate administrative area, during the World War II Japanese occupation of China. In December 1937 neighboring Hangzhou fell to the Japanese army and in January 1939 Japanese and Chinese forces fought for control of Fuyang. In 1942 Japanese forces clashed with Chinese Guomindang troops for control of Xindeng during a Japanese offensive against Jinhua, the then capital of Zhejiang province. The United States Army Air Forces bombed Japanese positions in Fuyang in August 1943, reportedly inflicting hundreds of casualties. In early August 1945, Japanese troops launched an offensive from Fuyang and captured the neighboring centers of Tonglu, Xindeng, and Lin'an City.

In 2011, a serious storm caused damage to many buildings in Fuyang. On the 23June, 457 farmhouses collapsed through storm damage, leading to compensation claims of more than 50,000 yuan. The seriousness of the catastrophe surpassed that of a 2009 typhoon in which 380 farmhouses suffered damage. The reconstruction cost the government a significant amount.

Geography and climate
The city extends  EW and  NS.

The area has many low mountains, hills, valleys, hills, basins, plains and other types of landscape. The low hilly area covers  (75.9%) of the total area, while the plains account for 18.7% and water areas 5.4%.

Located in northwestern Zhejiang province, in 1994 Fuyang was administratively merged into Hangzhou. The city has several highways including the G320 national road, Hangxijing, as well as highways 05, 23, 19 and 14.
In 2012, 45 natural disasters occurred in Fuyang, the majority not serious, although eight people died in October.

The climate in Fuyang is temperate and humid subtropical monsoon during the spring and summer seasons.

Architecture
A significant percentage of historic Fuyang city was demolished by wars in the 1940s and China's modernization campaign that began in the 1980s. Many of the notable structures standing in Fuyang today are of recent construction.

The Fuchun River waterfront runs several kilometers along the left bank of the river and is a center for social gatherings and sightseeing. Yu Dafu Park is located on the riverfront.

The Fuyang International Trade Center Hotel is one of the most prominent structures in Fuyang.

Mountains
Fuyang is known for its scenic mountain views and has numerous notable mountains, including Longmen Mountain, Ting Mountain, Guanshan Mountain and others. Many of these mountainous areas serve as places for locals to relax.

 Guan Mountain is one of the best known tourist attractions in Fuyang. The mountain takes its name from its resemblance to a stork standing close to the nearby Fuchun River. Throughout history, the mountain has been deemed a place of seclusion with many historic figures including Li Bai, the well-known Chinese Tang dynasty poet and Song dynasty poet and politician Su Dongpo repairing to the area. The Songjun Villa was the home of Fuyang poet and author Yu Dafu (18961945) and his mother. This and other sites have been preserved by the Fuyang local government.
 Mount Tianzhong is also a noted feature.

Parks and zoos
West of the island is the largest natural freshwater swimming pool in east China. The island is a popular tourist destination during the summer.
 Yu Dafu Park is located near the Fuchun River and is a memorial to the writer Yu Dafu.
 Hangzhou Wild Animal World Zoois the largest zoo in eastern China.
 Enbo Park is one of the oldest parks in Fuyang and is home to the historic Enbo Bridge.
 Changpukan is a well known location in Fuyang and includes Changpuling mountain.
 Guanshan Parkis located within Fuyang city east of the river, and is a first-level national scenic area, known as the east China culture notable mountains.
 Huang Gongwang Forest Park was named after painter Huang Gongwang's well-known masterpiece Fu chun shan ju tu.
 Dong Wu Park is on Jiangbin West Road and occupies . Inside the park, there is a  artificial lake. The design and the style of structure represent the culture of the Three Kingdoms Period.

Surrounding Villages
The village is surrounded by mountains. It is named after an ancient poem written by the poet Yan Ziling (严子陵) when he visited here. Also, it is the homeland of Sun Quan, who was the king of Wu during the Three Kingdom Period. A children's entertainment park is located near the Rainbow bridge.
Jinzhu Village is located in Gaoqiao town.

One of the historic architectural features in Fuyang is Longmengkezhan, noted for its local specialties and traditional snacks such as Shenxian Chicken and Youcaidofupi. People believe that the great Sun Quan set off from exactly here after his mother made him the special food of his hometown. Increasing numbers of tourists now visit this place of interest.

Government
The chief political officer of the Fuyang Municipal People's Government is the Mayor of Fuyang. Under the mayor are deputy mayors and chief directors of municipal departments of the office and city bureau. In addition there is a local Vice Secretary of the Communist Party, a position currently occupied by Huang Haifeng  Huang also serves as the acting Mayor of Fuyang.

The executive vice mayor of Fuyang is Tong Dinggan. There are several vice mayors, including Fang Renzhen, Han Lu, Wang Xiaoding, Wang Shupin, Qiu Fushui, and Sun Jie. Jiang Jun is the secretary of Fuyang district committee of the Communist Party. The bureau chief of Fuyang is Liu xuejun,  while Xu Fengming serves as the state taxation bureau chief of Fuyang

Administrative divisions

There are four subdistricts, 15 towns, and six townships under the city's administration:

Subdistricts
Fuchun Subdistrict
Lushan Subdistrict
Dongzhou Subdistrict
Chunjiang Subdistrict

Towns

Gaoqiao
Shoujiang
Changkou
Chang'an
Wanshi
Dongqiao
Xukou
Xindeng (Sinteng)
Luzhu
Lingqiao
Dayuan
Changlü
Longmen
Lishan
Yongchang

Townships
Huanshan Township
Huyuan Township
Shangguan Township
Yushan Township
Chunjian Township
Xintong Township

Economy
The city's GDP in 2010 was 41.58 billion yuan while in December 2012 the consumer price index (CPI) increased by 0.9%

Fuyang, especially the Chunjiang Subdistrict, is an industrial center with over 200 paper mills and copper factories. Light industries including paper making and textiles industry constitute about eighty-percent of Fuyang's domestic industry. The paper-making industry was originally based in the small village of Liyuan with the best known product being strawboard.

Fuyang ranks in the top 100 towns in China for economic growth.

The first business village in Fuyang was Tangjiawu.

In May 1992, based on Fuyang's location, resources and industrial advantages, four centers were established in Fuchun Bay, Farmers City, Silver Lake and Takahashi to speed up the improvement of infrastructure, promote investment, and introduce a large number of projects driven by the tourism industry, real estate and other tertiary industries. Integration with Hangzhou's large scale transportation and travel infrastructure was also made a priority.

The Fuyang Economic Development Zone, formerly known as the Fuchun River Economic Development Zone was founded in 1992. It was the first provincial-level development zone approved by the People's Government of Zhejiang Province. In 2005, following a national audit it was upgraded to the Fuyang Economic Development Zone, and in 2012 it became the Fuyang National Economic and Technological Development Zone.

In 2002, the richest man in Fuyang was Jianyi Wang. He was also considered the 99th wealthiest Chinese by Forbes.

Notable companies
Zhejiang Fuchunjiang Smelting Co.,Ltd. was founded in 1958 and is located on the banks of the Fuchun River. The company specializes in the production and operation of copper smelting and employees more than 990 people, include engineers and technical personnel. Average annual output is 36,000 tons of blister copper, 100,000 tons of electrolytic copper, four tons of gold, 120 tons of silver, and 80,000 tons of industrial sulfuric acid.

Zhejiang Fuchunjiang Environmental Thermoelectric Co.,Ltd. was the first listed company in Fuyang. The company is mainly engaged in the business of cogeneration. The main products are electricity and steam, with a total installed capacity of 88 mW and an average heating capacity of 415 ZhengDun/hour. Electricity and steam respectively accounted for 30% and 70% of operating income.

Transportation
Fuyang District is served by Line 6 (Hangzhou Metro). Another mode of public transportation in Fuyang is an extensive public bus system. The main bus terminals are located at Dapuzha, New Transport Station, Maternity Care Hospital, Second Food Market, Guanshan Park, Jiangnan High school, and Fuyang Film station. The fare for Fuyang's ubiquitous taxis start at 7 yuan. There are two long-distance bus stations in Fuyang, Fuyang New Bus Station and Fuyang New South Bus Station. There are frequent buses running between Fuyang District and urban area of Hangzhou, and other nearby cities.

The major highway near Fuyang is the  Highway 320, which begins in Shanghai and ends in Yunnan. Lushan Street is the main throughway in Fuyang. Private vehicles traveling along the highways connecting Fuyang with Hangzhou and neighboring urban centers are subject to toll fees.

Education
There are a number of primary and secondary schools located in Fuyang administered by the Fuyang Metropolitan Education Board. Xu Yichao is director general of the Fuyang Education Department. Among the schools that fall under the Fuyang Metropolitan Education Board's jurisdiction are:

Primary schools
Yongxing Primary School (永兴小学)
Fuyang No. 1 Primary School (富阳一小) Also known as Fuyang Experiment Primary School, it was founded in 1905 during the reign of the Qing dynasty Guangxu Emperor.
Fuyang No. 2 Primary School (富阳二小)
Fuyang No. 3 Primary school (富阳三小)
Fuyang No. 4 Primary school (富阳四小)
Fuyang No. 5 Primary school (富阳五小)
Fuyang No. 6 Primary school (富阳六小)
Fuyang No. 7 Primary school (富阳七小)
Fuyang Dayuanzhen Central School (富阳市大源镇中心小学)
Fuyang Chunjiang Central School (富阳市春江中心小学)
Fuyang Wanshizhen Central School (富阳市万市镇中心小学)

Middle schools
 Fuyang Yongxing Middle School (永兴中学) has 42 classes, more than 2400 students and 160 teachers. The school includes various courses, especially for the study of English. Students have six classes every week as well as morning and evening English reading time. Every Wednesday afternoon, there are more than 70 clubs for students to participate in and expand their outlook. Every year the school has a summer and winter camp, which provide students with opportunities to study aboard.
Fuchun Middle School (富春中学)
Yudafu Middle School (郁达夫中学)
Dongzhou Middle School (东州中学)
Fuchun Third Middle School (富春三中)

High schools
Fuyang High School, includes the Fuyang AP Center.  There are a total of almost 260 students who study at the Fuyang AP center, almost 60 students in grade 12, 70 students in grade 11 and 130 students in grade 10. Fuyang High School has sub-campuses, including Fuyang High School, Fuyang South River High school, Fuyang Yongxin Middle School, Fuyang Chunjiang Middle School and Fuyang High School AP Center. These five schools are all well known in Fuyang.
Jiangnan High School
Fuyang No. 2 High School, includes an international China-Canada center.
Xindeng High School
Changkou High School
Shiyan High School
Chengzhen Vocational School
Daqing Vocational School

College
Fuyang Radio & Television University, also known as Fuyang dianda.

Fuyang plans to build a college town in 2013.

Local food
Fuyangese cuisine has a long history and is based on the culinary traditions of Zhejiang Province. Taste, color, and freshness are important for components of traditional Fuyanese dishes, as is the shape of the final product. Some notable Fuyanese dishes includes Fuchun River Shad, pork and vegetable dish called qianjiang rousi., Fuyangese roast duck, You Deng Guo, sanshan chestnuts, and a Fuyanese version of tofu skin. Local produce includes Anding Mountain watermelon (安顶山西瓜) Anding Mountain Yunwu Tea, both cultivated on the farm land of local Anding Mountain. There is also a local fruit called baiguo.

Culture

Painting

Dwelling in the Fuchun Mountains
Dwelling in the Fuchun Mountains is one of the top ten ancient masterpieces of China, created by Fuyang native Huang Gongwang. He began work on the painting in 1348 and took about three years to complete it then presented it to a Taoist priest as a gift in 1350. A century later, the painting was acquired by the Ming dynasty painter Shen Zhou (1427–1509). During the reign of the Chenghua Emperor (1465–1487), Shen Zhou sent the painting to an unnamed calligrapher to be inscribed. However, the son of this calligrapher seized the painting which, after a few changes of hands, reemerged on the market for sale at a high price. Unable to afford it, there was nothing Shen Zhou could do except to make a copy of the painting himself. This imitation by Shen Zhou has become the most well-known and acclaimed copy among all others.

Not long after he made the copy, Shen Zhou gave it to a bureaucrat friend named Fan Shunju. Fan Shunju then began to search for the authentic copy. When he found it, he bought it at a hefty price and invited Shen Zhou to inscribe it. Shen Zhou then noted down at the end of the scroll the story of how the painting was lost and found.

Over the following centuries, the painting passed through the hands of several owners, including Tan Zhiyi, Dong Qichang and Wu Zhengzhi. When Wu Zhengzhi died, he passed the painting to his third son Wu Hongyu, who loved the painting so much that when he went into seclusion, he left behind all valuables and only brought the painting and a copy of the Thousand Character Classic by Master Zhiyong.

Fortunately, Wu Hongyu's nephew Wu Jing'an rescued the painting, which was however already aflame and torn into two. The smaller piece, also the beginning section, measuring 51.4 centimeters long, was subsequently known as The Remaining Mountain. After passing through the hands of numerous collectors, it came into the possession of Wu Hufan, a painter and collector, during the 1940s. In 1956, it finally settled down in the Zhejiang Provincial Museum in Hangzhou.

In 2011, in order to help rebuild the relationship between mainland China and Taiwan, the Dwelling in the Fuchun Mountain was shown in Taipei's National Palace Museum.

Cinema
The spy film Tianji(天机•富春山居图)  will be released in June 2013. The film stars actress Lin Zhiling and actor Liu Dehua and some scenes were shot in Fuyang.

Embroidery
Yongzhen Mao, the Director of Hunan Shaping Xiang Embroidery Museum, after two years planning invited the Chinese Crafts and Artisan Masters Aiyun Liu, Yan Shen, Yan Yang, Qiaoyun Chen, Min Yang, Ying Luo and over 30 other masters to recreate Dwelling in the Fuchun Mountains as a tapestry. Over five months, the embroidery was finished according to its original size. It is now stored in the National Museum of China .

Festivals
Annual Fuchun River Sports Festival　is an important part of the implementation of the five-year action plan to build the city's charismatic personality, expand its visibility and influence, and improve the city's image to enhance the quality of life.
Banshan Peach Blossom Festival Since 2004, Fuyang has successfully held a Peach Blossom Festival.
Tea-picking Festival People enjoy picking tea and to feel like a farmer.

Notable individuals
Fuyang is the birthplace of many notable people dating back to Three Kingdoms period, including Li Zongmian, Li Tiao, and Lin Zhun.

Modern
Yu Dafu, one of the greatest Chinese literary figures of the first half of the 20th century. Among his works are the novels "Sinking", and "Guoqu." In 1945 Yu was executed in Singapore by the Japanese military and he is considered to be a Chinese martyr in the fight against Japanese imperialism.
Sun Jie, Chinese Olympic rower, was born in Fuyang on June13, 1986.
Hong Lei, the vice president of the Chinese Ministry of Foreign Affairs, was born in Fuyang in 1969 and attended Fuyang High School.
Yu Feng, noted artist and a niece of Yu Dafu. She was born in Fuyang in 1916.
Jiang Zhenghua, Vice-chairman of the Standing Committee of the Ninth National People's Congress, was born in Fuyang in 1937.
Mai Jia, a writer and scriptwriter, was born in 1964. He was a recipient of the Mao Dun literature prize. He earned 28 million yuan in 2010, which made him the 15th wealthiest writer in China. Mai served in the army for seventeen years. Originally called Benxu Jiang, Mai Jia lives in Dayuan, Fuyang. He wrote the novels Jiemi, Ansuan, and Fengsheng.
Xu Yulan, a noted Yue operatic.

Ancient
 Sun Quan, the king of Wu in the Three Kingdoms Period, was originally from Longmen in Fuyang.
Huang Gongwang was a noted painter who painted Dwelling in the Fuchun Mountains.
Tang Dynasty poet Luo Yin was originally from Longmen, Fuyang. He was born in AD 833.
 Li Zongmian, was a chancellor in the Tang dynasty.
 Tang Dynasty calligrapher Sun Guoting wrote the notable work Shu Pu.
 Two well known prime ministers in feudal China, Dong Bangda and Dong Hao, were a father and son who originated from Fuyang.

References

External links

 Fuyang City Introduction - EN.GOTOHZ.COM
  A BBS of Fuyang(simplified Chinese)
 Detailed Information of the Embroidery (simplified Chinese)
 Fuyang Rencai net

Geography of Hangzhou
Districts of Zhejiang